Thinocorus is a genus of seedsnipe, a South American family of small gregarious waders which have adapted to a vegetarian diet.

These birds look superficially like partridges in structure and bill shape. They have short legs and long wings. Their 2 or 3 eggs are laid in a shallow scrape on the ground.

Thinocorus contains the smaller two of the four seedsnipe species.

Species

References
Shorebirds by Hayman, Marchant and Prater 

 
Bird genera